Oluf van Steenwinckel (died 1659) was a Danish building master and engineer, probably the son of Hans van Steenwinckel the Younger.

Biography
In the 1640s he worked at Nykøbing Castle among other places and from 1651 to 52 he was Copenhagen's first City Surveyor (Danish: Stadskonduktør), involved in the cedestral registration and parcelling of Frederick III's New Copenhagen. In June 1659, during the Northern Wars, he participated in a failed attempt to recapture Kronborg Castle and was executed by the Swedish.

Legacy
A monument to Steenwinckel, Hans Lassen, Lorenz Tuxen and Henrik Gerner was later erected in the Jægersåris Memorial Park.

See also
 Hans van Steenwinckel

References

1659 deaths
Surveyors
Executed Danish people
17th-century executions by Sweden
Year of birth unknown
Danish people of Belgian descent